A. greggii  may refer to:
 Acacia greggii, a tree species native to the southwestern United States and northern Mexico
 Amaranthus greggii, the Gregg's amaranth or Josiah amaranth, an annual flowering plant species native to Texas, Louisiana and Mexico

See also
 Greggii